Bolshoy Bukor is a rural locality (a selo) and the administrative center of Bolshebukorskoye Rural Settlement, Chaykovsky, Perm Krai, Russia. The population was 996 as of 2010. There are 11 streets.

Geography 
Bolshoy Bukor is located 19 km southeast of Chaykovsky. Maly Bukor is the nearest rural locality.

References 

Rural localities in Chaykovsky urban okrug